Betty Lou Bolden Thompson (December 3, 1939 - July 11, 2021) was an American Democrat politician who served in the Missouri House of Representatives.

Born in Helm, Mississippi, she attended Vashon High School, Sumner High School, Hubbards Business College, Harris-Stowe State University, and Washington University in St. Louis.

Betty L. Thompson was a civil rights leader and politician from St. Louis, Missouri. She was born on December 3, 1939, and was raised in a large family of 12 siblings. Thompson was born with alopecia, a condition that causes hair loss, which she embraced throughout her life.

Thompson graduated from Sumner High School and attended Harris-Stowe State College.

In 1996, Thompson was elected to the Missouri House of Representatives, where she served for eight years as a member of the Democratic Party. During her time in office, she was known for her advocacy for education and civil rights. She was a champion of public schools and worked to increase funding for education programs in the state.

Throughout her life, Thompson was actively involved in civil rights and community organizations, including the NAACP and the Urban League. She also served on the boards of several organizations, including the National Conference of State Legislatures and the National Black Caucus of State Legislators.

Thompson passed away on July 11, 2021, at the age of 81. She is remembered as a trailblazer and advocate for justice, education, and civil rights in Missouri.

References

1939 births
2021 deaths
20th-century American politicians
21st-century American politicians
Democratic Party members of the Missouri House of Representatives
People from Washington County, Mississippi
Women state legislators in Missouri
21st-century American women politicians
20th-century American women politicians
Harris–Stowe State University alumni
Washington University in St. Louis alumni